Shiv Singh Malla or Shiv Sing Malla, also known as Bir Singh Malla, was the forty-second king of the Mallabhum. He ruled from 1370 to 1407 CE.

History
Shiv Singh Malla was another important king of the Mallabhum. During his time music had got an important position.

References

Sources
 

Malla rulers of the Bankura
Kings of Mallabhum
14th-century Indian monarchs
Malla rulers
Mallabhum